USS G. W. Blunt was a Sandy Hook pilot boat acquired by the Union Navy during the American Civil War in 1861. See George W. Blunt (1856) for more details. She was used by the Union Navy as a gunboat as well as a dispatch boat in support of the Union Navy blockade of Confederate waterways.

Towards the war's end, she was reconfigured as a rescue and salvage ship. Her new task was to remove many of the shipwrecks, hulks, and other in-water debris of war.

Construction and service – commissioned in 1861 

The G. W. Blunt, formerly the pilot schooner George W. Blunt, was a wooden two-masted schooner built by Daniel Westervelt in New York and launched 6 September 1856. The schooner was acquired by the Navy Department in New York City on 23 November 1861 by George D. Morgan, who was the purchase agent for the U.S. government. The cost was $10,000. As a result of this purchase, the Sandy Hook pilots had a replacement boat built in July 1861, from Boston builders Brown & Lovell She was commissioned on 4 December 1861 and acting Master was Henry Sherwood who was in command.

Union Navy service 
Arriving at Port Royal, South Carolina, on 11 December 1861, G. W. Blunt served as a mail and dispatch boat for the South Atlantic Blockading Squadron between Charleston, South Carolina, Wassaw Sound, Georgia, and Fernandina, Florida. En route to Georgetown, South Carolina, on 19 April 1862 she captured the blockade-running schooner Wave with a cargo of cotton.

For the following year, the G. W. Blunt was on a blockade duty off Charleston and assisted in capturing several more vessels. She departed Port Royal, South Carolina, for Philadelphia, Pennsylvania, on 7 May 1863 and was decommissioned for repairs on 13 May 1863. Recommissioned on 2 June 1863, the G. W. Blunt rejoined the blockading squadron off Charleston, patrolling the many small inlets and bays near the main harbor.

Cruising on Charleston station on 1864, the G. W. Blunt was sent to Port Royal on 7 August 1864 and on 25 August was fitted with diving equipment for salvage duty. She was sent to Savannah, Georgia, on 1 March 1865 to clear obstructions from the harbor, and returned to Charleston 1 April 1865.

Post-war decommissioning and sale 

The G. W. Blunt was decommissioned on 16 August 1865 at Port Royal and was sold there on 20 October 1865.

Footnotes

References

External links

 United States Navy
 American Civil War

American Civil War patrol vessels of the United States
Blockade runners of the American Civil War
Dispatch boats of the United States Navy
Gunboats of the United States Navy
Pilot boats
Rescue and salvage ships of the United States Navy
Service vessels of the United States
Ships of the Union Navy
Schooners of the United States Navy